The Yanks Are Coming is a 1942 American patriotic musical film from Poverty Row studio Producers Releasing Corporation directed by Alexis Thurn-Taxis.

Plot
During World War II singer Bob Reynolds leaves his band to enlist in the US Army.  His band soon follows him where the Army uses the group to put on a show for the troops.

Cast
 Henry King as Gil Whitney 
 Mary Healy as Rita Edwards 
 Little Jackie Heller as Sammy Winkle
 (Slapsie) Maxie Rosenbloom as Butch
 William Roberts as Bob Reynolds
 Parkyarkarkus as Parky
 Dorothy Dare as Peggy
 Lynn Starr as Vicki
 Jane Novak as Flora
 Charles Purcell as Corporal Jenks
 Forrest Taylor as Captain Brown
 David O'Brien as Sergeant Callahan
 and Lew Pollack as himself
Uncredited
 Snub Pollard as Soldier in canteen

Prolog

Text in opening credits 
"This picture is humbly dedicated to The millions of Yanks and the Armed Forces of the United Nations whose devotion, gallantry and courage is destined to wipe the Axis scourge from the face of the earth, in order that Democracy and the Freedom of Man may survive."

Narration by Anson Bond 
"This is America. Homeland of a people strong and self reliant... proud in the way of free men. A land where liberty, equality and justice are living breathing symbols of a way of life. Where the right of free speech, freedom of the press and the right to worship without hindrance or let are a nation's birthright. A nation without master, without slave, where the right to education and learning are limited only by ambition... where old age is venerated and loved... not beaten and destroyed. And where the right to the pursuit of happiness is open to all, regardless of race, creed or color... where music and the other arts are not restricted by the word verboten."

Songs

Music by Lew Pollack and Tony Stern, lyrics by Herman Ruby and Sidney Clare 
 "The Yanks Are Coming" (Henry King and his Orchestra)
 "I Must Have Priorities on Your Love" (William Roberts [singing voice of uncredited William Marshall] and Lynn Starr)
 " There Will Be No Blackout of Democracy"
 "Zip Your Lip" (Parkyarkarkus)

Music and lyrics by Kay Crothers and Dr. Arthur Garland 
 Don't Fool Around with My Heart (William Roberts [singing voice of uncredited William Marshall] and Lynn Starr)

References

External links
 
 
 

1942 films
1942 musical comedy films
1942 romantic comedy films
American musical comedy films
American romantic comedy films
Producers Releasing Corporation films
American romantic musical films
American black-and-white films
World War II films made in wartime
1940s romantic musical films
1940s English-language films